Chibabo is a village in south-western Angola. It is located in Cunene Province

Nearby towns and villages include Bela-Bela (4.9 nm), Ulundo (4.0 nm), Techango (2.9 nm) and Lupembe (1.4 nm).

Populated places in Cunene Province